In the Latin-based orthographies of many European languages, including English, a distinction between hard and soft  occurs in which  represents two distinct phonemes.

History
Later, other languages not directly descended from Latin, such as English, inherited this feature as an orthographic convention.

English

General overview

There are exceptions to the general rules of hard and soft :
 The  in the words Celt and Celtic was traditionally soft, but since the late 19th century, the hard pronunciation has also been recognized in conscious imitation of the classical Latin pronunciation of Celtae; see Pronunciation of Celtic. Welsh and Gaelic loanwords in English which retain their native spelling, such as ceilidh, cistvaen (alternatively spelled ) or Cymric, are also pronounced hard. The Irish and Welsh languages have no letter K, so all Cs are pronounced hard.
 The  in sceptic, and its derivatives such as sceptical and scepticism, represents .
 The  is silent before  in indict and its derivatives such as indictment, in the name of the U.S. state Connecticut, and in some pronunciations of Arctic and Antarctic.
 In a few cases such as facade and limacon, a soft  appears before  and is optionally indicated to be soft by means of attaching a cedilla to its bottom, giving façade, limaçon.

A silent  can occur after  at the end of a word or component root word part of a larger word. The  can serve a marking function indicating that the preceding  is soft, as in dance and enhancement. The silent  often additionally indicates that the vowel before  is a long vowel, as in rice, mace, and pacesetter.

The suffixes -ify and -ise/-ize can be added to most nouns and adjectives to form new verbs. The digraph  may be used to retain the hard  pronunciation in inflections and derivatives of a word such as trafficking from the verb traffic.

There are several cases in English in which hard and soft  alternate with the addition of suffixes as in critic/criticism and electric/electricity (electrician has a soft  pronunciation of  because of yod-coalescence).

Letter combinations
These come primarily from loanwords.

Besides a few examples (recce, soccer, Speccy),  fits neatly with the regular rules of : Before , the second  is soft while the first is hard.

Many placenames and other proper nouns with -cester (from Old English ceaster, meaning Roman station or walled town) are pronounced with  such as Worcester, Gloucester ( or ), and Leicester. The  pronunciation occurs as a combination of a historically soft  pronunciation and historical elision of the first vowel of the suffix.

Italian loanwords
The original spellings and pronunciations of Italian loanwords have mostly been kept. Many English words that have been borrowed from Italian follow a distinct set of pronunciation rules corresponding to those in Italian.

Meanwhile,  in Italian represents , not , but English-speakers commonly mispronounce it as  due to familiarity with the German pronunciation.

Suffixation issues
Rarely, the use of unusual suffixed forms to create neologisms occurs. For example, the words ace and race are both standard words but adding -ate or -age (both productive affixes in English) would create spellings that seem to indicate hard  pronunciations. ( and racage).

Replacement with 

Examples include the Mortal Kombat franchise and product names such as Kool-Aid and Nesquik. More intensely, this use of  has also been used to give extremist or racist connotations.

Other languages
Some non-Romance languages like German, Danish and Dutch use  in loanwords and also make this distinction.
 in Italian, Romanian, and Old English;
 in English, French, Portuguese, Catalan, Latin American Spanish, and in words loaned into Dutch and the Scandinavian languages;
 in European and equatoguinean Spanish;
 in words loaned into German. This is one of the more archaic pronunciations, and was also the pronunciation in Old Spanish, Old French and other historical languages where it is now pronounced .
The hard  occurs in all other positions and represents  in all these aforementioned languages, including in the case of ⟨c⟩ that comes before the Romanian letter î, which is different from i.

In Italian and Romanian, the orthographic convention for representing  before front vowels is to add  (Italian chiaro,  'clear').  is used to accomplish the same purpose in Catalan, Portuguese, Spanish, and French. Rarely, the use of unusual suffixed forms to create neologisms occurs. For example, the words saco and taco are both standard words but adding -es or -ez (both productive affixes in Spanish) would create spellings that seem to indicate soft  pronunciations. ( and tacez).
In French, Catalan, Portuguese, and Old Spanish a cedilla is used to indicate a soft  pronunciation when it would otherwise seem to be hard. (French garçon , 'boy'; Portuguese coração , 'heart'; Catalan caçar , 'to hunt'). However, this is essentially equivalent because despite common misconception the symbol  is actually derived from a Visigothic Z.

In Irish, ⟨c⟩ usually represents a hard , but represents  before e or i, or after i. In Scottish Gaelic, broad  is one of /kʰ ʰk ʰk k/, and slender  is one of /kʰʲ ʰkʲ ʰkʲ kʲ/, depending on the phonetic environment.

A number of orthographies do not make a hard/soft distinction. The  is always hard in Welsh but is always soft in Slavic languages, Hungarian, and in Hanyu Pinyin transcription system of Mandarin Chinese, where it represents  and in Indonesian and many of the transcriptions of the languages of India such as Sanskrit and Hindi, where it always represents . See also C § Other languages.

Swedish has a similar phenomenon with hard and soft : this results from a similar historical palatalization development.

The letter , outside of the digraph , always represents a hard /k/ sound. However, it never occurs in "soft positions", i.e. before , where  is used instead, while  never occurs elsewhere except in the digraph  and a few loanwords. Quite ironically, the names of the letters "c" and "k" are borrowed from Europe and those letters don't even occur in their own letter names (C: xê and K: ca.) Hồ Chí Minh had proposed a simplified spelling, as shown in the title of one of his books, 'Đường kách mệnh'.

Old Bohemian has hard c, but pronounce was [x] Schecowitz, Tocowitz, Crudim

See also 
C
English orthography
I before E except after C
Hard and soft G

Notes

References

 

Consonants
Spelling
English orthography